Petko Tsankov (born 19 December 1995) is a Bulgarian professional footballer who plays as a winger for Dobrudzha.

Career
He made his first team début in a goalless away draw with Marek (Bulgarian Cup 1st round) on 18 September 2013, coming on as substitute for Ivan Kokonov.  A few days later, he made his first A Group appearance in a 2–1 home win against Pirin Gotse Delchev on 29 September, again replacing Kokonov.

In February 2017, Tsankov joined Bulgarian Second League outfit Vitosha Bistritsa.

Career statistics

References

External links

1995 births
Living people
Bulgarian footballers
Association football midfielders
PFC Cherno More Varna players
PFC Kaliakra Kavarna players
PFC Dobrudzha Dobrich players
FC Chernomorets Balchik players
FC Vitosha Bistritsa players
PFC Beroe Stara Zagora players
FC Dunav Ruse players
PFC Ludogorets Razgrad II players
FC Lokomotiv Gorna Oryahovitsa players
First Professional Football League (Bulgaria) players